NHLPA may refer to:

 National Hockey League Players' Association, a players' union
 National Historic Lighthouse Preservation Act of 2000
 NHLPA Hockey '93, a video game released by Electronic Arts for the Genesis and Super NES video game platforms in 1992